Flaying of Marsyas is a 1531 painting by the Florentine artist Bronzino, depicting the flaying (skinning alive) of Marsyas by Apollo after the satyr rashly challenged the Greek god to a musical contest. It is held in the Hermitage Museum.

References

1531 paintings
Paintings in the collection of the Hermitage Museum
Paintings by Bronzino